Pseudomonas asplenii is a Gram-negative soil bacterium that causes bacterial leaf blight of the bird's-nest fern (Asplenium nidus), from which it derives its name.

References

External links
 Type strain of Pseudomonas asplenii at BacDive -  the Bacterial Diversity Metadatabase

Pseudomonadales
Bacterial plant pathogens and diseases
Ornamental plant pathogens and diseases
Bacteria described in 1947